Gallos may refer to:

People
Geza Gallos (1948–2013), Austrian footballer
Hermann Gallos (1886–1957), Austrian operatic tenor and academic teacher

Sculpture
Gallos (sculpture) by Rubin Eynon, at Tintagel Castle, Cornwall

Sports
Gallos Blancos de Hermosillo, former soccer team in Hermosillo, Sonora, Mexico
Gallos de Caliente commonly known as Tijuana, or simply as Xolos, Mexican professional football club in Tijuana
Gallos de Sancti Spíritus, baseball team in the Cuban National Series
Gallos Hidrocálidos de Aguascalientes, former football club from Aguascalientes, Mexico

See also
Gallo (disambiguation)